The 2016 Tour of Croatia was the 2nd edition of the Tour of Croatia cycling stage race. The race started on 19 April in Osijek and ended on 24 April in Zagreb and consisted of six stages. The race is part of the 2016 UCI Europe Tour, and is rated as a 2.1 event.

The race has been won by Synergy Baku Cycling Project's Croatian rider Matija Kvasina, who took the leader's jersey after winning the fourth stage. Giacomo Nizzolo claimed the Points classification, Riccardo Zoidl won the Mountains classification, and Domen Novak finished first in the Young Rider classification Synergy Baku Cycling Project won the Teams classification.

Schedule

Participating teams
Twenty-one (21) teams participated in the 2016 edition of the Tour of Croatia.

Classification leadership

Final standings

General classification

Points classification

Mountains classification

Young riders classification

Team classification

References

External links
 

2016
Tour of Croatia
Tour of Croatia